Leucae or Leukai was a town of ancient Laconia situated at the northern extremity of the plain Leuce which extended inland between Acriae and Asopus on the eastern side of the Laconian Gulf.

Its site is located near the modern Molaoi.

References

Populated places in ancient Laconia
Former populated places in Greece